Stansfield is a village in the St Edmundsbury district of Suffolk.

Stansfield may refer to:

People
 Stansfield (surname)
 Stansfield Turner (1923–2018), American admiral
 Robert Timothy Stansfield Frankford (1939–2015), Canadian politician

Places
Stansfield, West Yorkshire, an ancient township near Todmorden, West Yorkshire
Stansfield Hall, Todmorden, Grade II* listed historic house in Stansfield, Todmorden, West Yorkshire
Stansfield Hall railway station, former railway station in Todmorden, West Yorkshire
Stansfield Tower, tower in Blacko, Pendle, Lancashire
Stansfield Windmill, windmill near the village of Stansfield, Suffolk
Stansfield's Varieties, former name of the Leeds City Varieties music hall
Mount Stansfield, Enderby Land, Antarctica

See also
 Stansfeld, a surname
 Stanfield (disambiguation) for an alternative spelling of the name